Tomorrow Woman is a fictional character, an android in stories published in DC Comics. She debuted in JLA #5 (May 1997), and was created by Grant Morrison and Howard Porter. Within the DC Comics canon, she is created by the mad scientist super-villains Professor Ivo and T.O. Morrow. Given human-like physical characteristics and false memories of a human life, Tomorrow Woman believes herself to be a new superhero born with psionic abilities due to a "four-lobed brain". Her true purpose is to infiltrate and then kill the Justice League. In her first appearance, she says she exclusively has telekinetic abilities, but a later flashback issue of JLA: Tomorrow Woman (1998) reveals that she also has telepathic abilities.

In the weekly comic book series Trinity, a different version of Tomorrow Woman appeared, a woman named Clara Kendall from a parallel Earth.

Fictional character biography
The immortal Professor Ivo, creator of the android villain Amazo, and T. O. Morrow, creator of the android villain-turned-hero Red Tornado, decide to join forces and create a new android together that will destroy the newly reformed Justice League of America. Hearing the JLA is holding a new membership drive soon, the two scientists decide to create an agent who will infiltrate the team as a new member and then eventually destroy them with a lethal electromagnetic pulse (EMP) weapon designed to shut down brain activity. While Ivo gives their creation artificial skin, musculature and organs, giving it temperature, pulse, and other human characteristics, Morrow creates the artificial mind, programming a personality capable of learning and adapting, implanting false memories of a human life. The android, Tomorrow Woman, believes she is a human born with mutant abilities due to having a "four-lobed brain", a possible preview of how humanity may evolve in thousands of years (a similar explanation was given to explain the mutant abilities of DC hero Captain Comet). To make their victory more enjoyable, Ivo and Morrow program Tomorrow Woman to act and think as a noble hero, only activating the EMP weapon after she feels she has firmly gained the trust of the entire team.

At the membership drive, Tomorrow Woman is the last to arrive and impresses the Justice League with her formidable telekinetic powers as well as her kind, earnest, and altruistic nature. After passing their tests and fooling their equipment, as well as the telepathy of Martian Manhunter and the heightened senses of Superman, she is accepted into the team. For the next few weeks, Tomorrow Woman primarily helps the Justice League against a strange menace called IF, which turns out to be a weapon from the future. The League realizes an electromagnetic pulse can deactivate IF and prevent it from causing more destruction. Tomorrow Woman's programming to kill the League activates, but she resists it, telling Green Lantern (Kyle Rayner) that she believes something inside her is bad but that she will choose to act as a hero. She then sacrifices herself, using the EMP weapon to destroy IF and herself. While Ivo is furious at this development, Morrow reveals he deliberately made Tomorrow Woman's brain advanced enough to develop her own personality and ethics, and so her act of free will is an example of his genius and proof that he is better at creating artificial life than Ivo is. Realizing Tomorrow Woman's true nature, the League tracks down and captures Ivo and Morrow. Later, Superman oversees Tomorrow Woman's burial, stating that she was a living woman and not simply a robot.

Despite dying in the same issue in which she debuted, Tomorrow Woman gained some popularity with fans and so her short time with the League was expanded on in the one-shot issue JLA: Tomorrow Woman (1998). This flashback story depicts Tomorrow Woman having telepathy as well as telekinesis and being aware of her true programming earlier. She is initially cynical in her attitude towards the team and finds their trust of her laughable. Her views change after she is emotionally affected by her experiences in saving children and then experiencing compassion rather than judgment from the League when she acts rashly or negatively. Initially asking to be allowed to kill the team sooner rather than continue to experience these new and confusing emotions, she later determines that if the time comes to attack the team she will find a way to save them instead and prove she is greater than her programming.

Tomorrow Woman made a third appearance in the Hourman series. The third Hourman, an android with time manipulation powers that last for an hour, is exploring the nature of artificial life. He decides to revive Tomorrow Woman. They discuss his moral quandary but then Tomorrow Woman insists on using her last 50 minutes of borrowed time to help whoever she can. While acting heroically and saving lives, she teaches Hourman the value and lasting effects of heroic action, and the two feel a bond. When the hour ends, Tomorrow Woman vanishes and Hourman mourns her.

Trinity
In the 52-issue weekly miniseries Trinity, time and space are disrupted, creating unstable alternate timelines. Issues #21–24 depict an Earth of an alternate timeline defended by the Justice Society International (JSA), an alternate version of DC's usual Justice Society team. Just as the Justice League includes Superman, Batman, and Wonder Woman as a "trinity" of heroes, the JSI has its own trinity: Black Adam, Green Arrow, and a hero called Tomorrow Woman who resembles the android who served in the JLA in the original timeline. This hero, who is also telepathic and telekinetic, initially has no cover identity but then her unstable reality shifts and she becomes a version of Tomorrow Woman who is also secretly GBS TV news reporter Clara Kendall. Later on, Clara discovers she is actually an android. After helping to restore reality and nearly sacrificing herself in the process, her timeline is restored as a reward. In the stabilized version of her timeline, Clara discovers she is a biological human rather than an android.

Powers and abilities
Tomorrow Woman is an artificial life-form, an android with artificial skin and organs who possesses telepathic and telekinetic powers. She is programmed with false memories of a cover identity and so seems to initially believe that her powers are due to her being born a mutant with an advanced "four-lobed brain".

Her telepathy allows her to read minds and project her thoughts. Her telepathy is focused enough to be able to forcibly free people from being mind-controlled by others without harming them in the process. She sometimes has trouble filtering out heightened emotions of people around her or even people she can perceive on television. Her telepathic defenses were strong and subtle enough that even when she became aware of her lethal programming, she was able to hide her true purpose from Martian Manhunter and Aquaman during a telepathic link. Her telekinetic blasts can stun a person without damaging them or increase in power so as to shatter steel and concrete. She can fly through telekinetic manipulation. The android Tomorrow Woman's secret weapon was an electromagnetic pulse device that could disrupt human brain activity, killing anyone within its blast radius.

References

External links
 DCU Guide: Tomorrow Woman

Comics characters introduced in 1997
DC Comics female superheroes
DC Comics metahumans
DC Comics robots
Fictional gynoids
Fictional robots
DC Comics characters who have mental powers
DC Comics telekinetics 
DC Comics telepaths
Characters created by Grant Morrison 
Fictional characters with energy-manipulation abilities